The Democratic Voice of Burma (abbreviated DVB) is one of Myanmar's largest independent media organisations.

DVB was founded as a non-profit media organization based in Oslo, Norway and Chiang Mai, Thailand. Run by Burmese expatriates, it made radio and television broadcasts aimed at providing uncensored news and information about Burma. Since 2012 DVB gradually moved back into Burma, where it became one of the country's largest and most well-respected TV broadcasters. In March 2021, the organisation was banned by Burma's military dictatorship and moved back underground.

In July 1992, DVB began broadcasting programming into Burma from studios in Oslo, Norway and transmitting via shortwave radio from the Norwegian transmitter at Kvitsoy. Now the broadcast is sent via satellite and free-to-air digital tv.

On May 28, 2005, DVB expanded its programming and began satellite television broadcasts into the country. The organization stated that it hoped to reach some ten million Burmese through this new effort (which it claims is the first free and independent Burmese language television channel), which was funded in part by non-governmental organizations such as Free Voice of the Netherlands, the National Endowment for Democracy, and the Freedom of Expression Foundation.

In 2012, DVB started multimedia operations inside Myanmar openly, running a branch office with its former underground VJs. On March 24, 2018, DVB started broadcasting on digital terrestrial television on MRTV DVB-T2 multiplex system.

Following the violent military coup staged on 1 February 2021, the Burmese Military began systematically cracking down on freedom of speech within the country. On 8 March, DVB—along with four other networks—were banned by the junta. The arrests and torture of journalists is an ongoing theme of Burma's 2021 military coup. Thus far, five DVB staff have been detained or arrested following violent abductions performed by the Burmese military.

In the first half of 2021, the police in Thailand arrested three journalists. They face the charge of illegal entry into Thailand.

DVB's work has been used by news networks the world over. Myanmar's Military Ambitions, an expose of the Burmese military's nuclear ambition, was broadcast by Al Jazeera in 2011. The PBS documentary 'Eyes of the Storm' is an account of 2008's Cyclone Nargis shot largely by DVB film makers. The Oscar nominated documentary, Burma VJ, recounts the experiences of DVB reporters during Burma's 2007 Saffron Revolution.

Mission
DVB states that it has four primary goals:
the provision of "accurate and unbiased news to the people of Burma"
to "promote understanding and cooperation" among Burma's religious and ethnic populations
to "encourage and sustain independent public opinion" and to provide for "social and political debate"
to "impart the ideals of democracy and human rights" to the Burmese people

See also
2007 Burmese anti-government protests
National Coalition Government of the Union of Burma
Burma VJ

References

External links
 Official website
NBC News report (video) Dawna Friesen, "Myanmar regime trying to suppress protestors", September 26, 2007
Burmese officer wants asylum in Norway,
Live streaming on Livestation
Eyes of the Storm PBS documentary shot primarily by Democratic Voice of Burma

International broadcasters
Mass media in Myanmar
Human rights in Myanmar
Burmese democracy movements
Television channels in Myanmar
Radio stations established in 1992